Alan Hardy is an Australian writer and producer, who has worked extensively in television.

He is the son of Frank Hardy and the father of Marieke Hardy.

Select Credits
The Sullivans - producer
All the Rivers Run (1983) - producer
The Henderson Kids - producer
The Bob Morrison Show
Neighbours (2011–13) - producer

References

External links

Australian television producers
Living people
Year of birth missing (living people)